Luarsab is a Georgian male name derived from the Persian Lohrāsp, a name of the legendary Kayanid king from Ferdowsi’s Shahnameh who reigned for 120 years.

Notable people bearing this name 
Luarsab I of Kartli
Luarsab II of Kartli
Prince Luarsab of Kartli
Prince Luarsab of Kartli (died 1698)

Georgian masculine given names